Louis Hartz (April 8, 1919 – January 20, 1986) was an American political scientist, historian, and a professor at Harvard, where he taught from 1942 until 1974. Hartz’s teaching and various writings —books and articles— have had an important influence on American political theory and comparative history.

Early years
Hartz was born in Youngstown, Ohio, the son of Russian Jewish immigrants, but grew up in Omaha, Nebraska. After graduating from Technical High School in Omaha, he attended Harvard University, financed partly by a scholarship from the Omaha World Herald.

Academic career
Hartz graduated in 1940, spent a year traveling abroad on a fellowship, and returned to Harvard as a teaching fellow in 1942. He earned his doctorate in 1946 and became a full professor of government in 1956. Hartz was known at Harvard for his talented and charismatic teaching. He retired in 1974 because of ill health.

The Liberal Tradition in America
Hartz is best known for his classic book The Liberal Tradition in America (1955), which presented a view of the United States past that sought to explain its conspicuous absence of ideologies. Hartz argued that American political development occurs within the context of an enduring, underlying Lockean liberal consensus, which has shaped and narrowed the landscape of possibilities for U.S. political thought and behavior. Hartz attributed the triumph of the liberal worldview in America, amongst other reasons, to:
its lack of a feudal past (and which would account for the absence of a struggle to overcome a conservative internal order); 
its vast resources and open space; 
the liberal values of the original settlers, who represented only a narrow middle-class slice of European society.

Hartz also wanted to explain the failure of socialism to become established in America, and he believed that Americans' pervasive, unthinking consensual acceptance of classic liberalism was the major barrier.

The Founding of New Societies
Hartz edited and wrote substantial sections of The Founding of New Societies (1964), wherein he developed and expanded upon his “fragment thesis.” Hartz developed this thesis from the idea that those nations which originated as settler colonies are “fragments” of the original European nation that founded them. Hartz called them fragments because these colonies, in a sense, froze the class structure and underlying ideology prevalent in the mother country at the time of their foundation and did not experience the further evolution experienced in Europe. He considered Latin America and French Canada to be fragments of feudal Europe; the United States, English Canada, and Dutch South Africa to be liberal fragments; and Australia and English South Africa to be "radical" fragments (incorporating the nonsocialist working class radicalism of Britain in the early 19th century).

Later years and death

Hartz led a normal life until a sudden unexplained emotional disturbance changed his entire personality in 1971. He refused all medical help. He divorced in 1972, rejected all his friends, and feuded intensely with students, faculty and administrators. In 1974 he resigned from Harvard, but his scholarly skills and interests continued to remain strong. Hartz spent his last years living in London, New Delhi, New York City, then Istanbul, where he died of an  epileptic seizure in January 1986.

Legacy
In 1956, the American Political Science Association awarded Hartz its Woodrow Wilson Prize for The Liberal Tradition in America, and in 1977 gave him its Lippincott Prize, designed to honor scholarly works of enduring importance. The book remains a key text in the political science graduate curriculum in American politics in universities today, in part because of the extensive, longrunning criticism and commentary that Hartz's ideas have generated.

The Canadian context of Hartz's fragment thesis was disseminated and elaborated upon by Gad Horowitz, in the latter’s essay "Conservatism, Liberalism and Socialism in Canada: An Interpretation" (1966). Horowitz's use and interpretation of Hartz has been influential in Canadian political theory, and was still being actively debated well into the 21st century.

In Australia, Hartz's fragment thesis "received respectful attention, but ... did not win assent or committed followers", according to historian John Hirst. It was applied to early colonial history by feminist historian Miriam Dixson in The Real Matilda (1976), in which she traced gender relations in colonial New South Wales to the culture of the proletarian fragment identified by Hartz. In 1973, the Australian Economic History Review dedicated an issue to analysis of Hartz's theory.

Bibliography

Books
Economic Policy and Democratic Thought: Pennsylvania 1776-1860. 1948. Harvard University Press.
The Liberal Tradition in America: An Interpretation of American Political Thought since the Revolution. 1955. Harcourt, Brace.  
The Founding of New Societies: Studies in the History of the United States, Latin America, South Africa, Canada, and Australia. 1964. Harcourt, Brace & World. (edited). 
A Synthesis of World History, (Zurich, 1984).
The Necessity of Choice: Nineteenth-Century Political Thought. Edited with an introduction by Paul Roazen. 1990. Transaction Publishers.

Selected articles

 “John M. Harlan in Kentucky, 1855–1877”. Filson Club History Quarterly. 14 (1), January 1940. Archived from the original on May 2, 2012. Retrieved November 30, 2011.
“Otis and Anti-Slavery Doctrine.” 1939. The New England Quarterly 12(4): 745-747.
“Seth Luther: The Story of a Working-Class Rebel.” 1940. New England Quarterly 13(3): 401-418.
“Goals for Political Science: A Discussion.” 1951. American Political Science Review 45(4): 1001-1005.
“American Political Thought and the American Revolution.” 1952. American Political Science Review 46(2): 321-342.
“The Reactionary Enlightenment: Southern Political Thought before the Civil War.” 1952. Western Political Quarterly 5(1): 31-50.
“The Whig Tradition in America and Europe.” 1952. American Political Science Review 46(4): 989-1002.
“The Coming of Age of America.” 1957. American Political Science Review 51(2): 474-483.
“Conflicts within the Idea of the Liberal Tradition.” 1963. Comparative Studies in Society and History 5(3): 279-284.
“American Historiography and Comparative Analysis: Further Reflections.” 1963. Comparative Studies in Society and History 5(4): 365-377.
“The Nature of Revolution.” 2005 [1968]. Society 42(4): 54-61.

References

Sources
Barber, Benjamin. 1986. “Louis Hartz.” Political Theory 14(3): 355-358.

Further reading
Abbott, Philip. "Still Louis Hartz after All These Years: A Defense of the Liberal Society Thesis," Perspectives on Politics, Vol. 3, No. 1 (Mar., 2005), pp. 93–109 in JSTOR
Ericson, David and Louisa Green, eds. The Liberal Tradition in American Politics: Reassessing the Legacy of American Liberalism. 1999. Routledge.
 Hulliung, Mark, ed. The American Liberal Tradition Reconsidered: The Contested Legacy of Louis Hartz (University Press of Kansas; 2010) 285 pages; essays by  scholars that reevaluate Hartz's argument that the United States is inherently liberal.
 Kloppenberg, James T. "In Retrospect: Louis Hartz's "The Liberal Tradition in America," Reviews in American History, Vol. 29, No. 3 (Sept. 2001), pp. 460–478 in JSTOR
Smith, Rogers. “Beyond Tocqueville, Myrdal and Hartz: The Multiple Traditions in America.” American Political Science Review  1993.  87(3): 549-566.

1919 births
1986 deaths
Writers from Youngstown, Ohio
Harvard University alumni
American political scientists
American people of Russian-Jewish descent
Jewish American writers
Jewish historians
20th-century American historians
20th-century American Jews
20th-century political scientists